Peter Francis Stevens is a British botanist born in 1944.

He is a researcher at the Missouri Botanical Garden and professor of Biology of the University of Missouri–St. Louis. He is a member of the Angiosperm Phylogeny Group which created the APG, APG II, APG III, and APG IV systems.

He maintains a web site, APweb, hosted by the Missouri Botanical Garden, which has been regularly updated since 2001, and is a useful source for the latest research in angiosperm phylogeny which follows the APG approach.

The standard author abbreviation P.F.Stevens is used to indicate P. F. Stevens as the author when citing a botanical name. He has named dozens of species, mostly in the families Clusiaceae and Ericaceae, and he also described the genus Romnalda (Asparagaceae).

References

External links

 Peter F. Stevens (P.F.Stevens) in IPNI (list of species described by Peter F. Stevens)
 Personal page of Peter F. Stevens on Angiosperm Phylogeny Website

1944 births
Living people
21st-century American botanists
British taxonomists
Botanists with author abbreviations
University of Missouri–St. Louis people
Missouri Botanical Garden people
Angiosperm Phylogeny Group